Paulo Roberto Chamon de Castilho, known as Paulinho Guará (born 29 August 1979) is a Brazilian football player who currently is playing manager for Democrata.

Career 
Paulo signed for Hammarby IF on a four-year contract from Örgryte IS during the 2005 season (2005-08-19). He played for Örgryte IS from 2002 to 2005. In summer of 2008, he was loaned to Korean team Busan I'Park for one season. He then signed a contract with Busan I'Park. At 19 May 2010, Örebro SK loaned Paulinho for the rest of the 2010 season. On 9 February 2011 it was announced that he had signed with Hammarby for one year. Following a one-year stint with Hammarby, he joined the Portuguese second division, Liga de Honra side Naval in January 2012.
2015 Paulinho plays for Tigres do Brasil, a smaller club from Rio de Janeiro.

References

External links
 
 

1979 births
Living people
Association football forwards
Sportspeople from Minas Gerais
Brazilian footballers
Brazilian expatriate footballers
Brazilian people of Portuguese descent
Expatriate footballers in Sweden
Expatriate footballers in South Korea
Expatriate footballers in Portugal
Hammarby Fotboll players
Örgryte IS players
Busan IPark players
Örebro SK players
Associação Naval 1º de Maio players
Duque de Caxias Futebol Clube players
K League 1 players
Brazilian expatriate sportspeople in South Korea
Brazilian expatriate sportspeople in Sweden
Brazilian expatriate sportspeople in Portugal
Brazilian Protestants
Converts to Protestantism
Allsvenskan players
Superettan players